Chris Kobin is a screenwriter and film producer living in Los Angeles, California.

Personal
Kobin, a graduate of Ridgewood High School (New Jersey), Macalester College and Loyola Law School, turned down an offer from a Century City law firm and became a car salesman while trying to break into Hollywood. The John Landis film Slasher: an IFC Original was based on Kobin's experiences traveling the country staging "slasher sales".

Career
Kobin has produced the Made-For-TV Movies  Payback ABC TV (1997), A Vision of Murder: The Story of Donielle  CBS TV(2000), and Slasher: an IFC Original (2004). Feature Films which Kobin has written or co-written include Gothic Harvest (2019), 2001 Maniacs (2005), Snoop Dogg's Hood of Horror (2006), Driftwood (2006. and 2001 Maniacs: Field of Screams (2010).

Film Festival Premieres

Kobin's films have premiered in the following film festivals:

 Screamfest Horror Film Festival: Gothic Harvest (2019)
 Telluride Film Festival: Hollywood Don't Surf! (2011) North American Premiere
 Cannes Film Festival: Hollywood Don't Surf! (2010)
 Screamfest Horror Film Festival: Snoop Doggs Hood of Horror (2006)
 South by Southwest:  Slasher (2004)
 Slamdance Film Festival: The Girl Next Door (1999).

Filmography

The Hart Family Tragedy (2020)Gothic Harvest (2019)Hollywood Don't Surf! (2011)2001 Maniacs: Field of Screams (2010)Driftwood (2006)Snoop Dogg's Hood of Horror (2006)2001 Maniacs (2005)Slasher: an IFC Original (2004)A Vision of Murder: The Story of Donielle (2000)The Girl Next Door (1999)Payback (1997)

Television SeriesFlipping Vegas'' A&E Network (2011 - 2014)

References

External links
 
 New York Times: Chris Kobin filmography
 InBaseline: filmography
 
 

Year of birth missing (living people)
Living people
American film producers
American male screenwriters
Loyola Law School alumni
Macalester College alumni